Marco Parrino (born on April 18, 1995 in Alcamo) is an Italian businessman and writer. He is best known for Sicilia è amore, an editorial co-creation project for the promotion of Sicily, the income of which is donated to charity.

Early life and education 
Marco Parrino was born in Alcamo, Italy. He was graduated from the University of Bologna in Economics and did his Masters in Marketing Management from the Bocconi University in Milan. After his studies, he worked for various brands as a consultant in the high fashion industry, participating in various international events and to the creation of digital and editorial contents.

Career 
Since 2016, he has participated in several international fashion events including Pitti Uomo in Florence and in fashion week that were organized in Milan, London, Dubai and Istanbul. During his participation in these events, he collaborated with different brands such as Kia, John Varvatos (company), Hilton Worldwide, Rocco Forte Hotels, US POLO ASS etc. developing digital content for protmotion. Marco has been the official guest of many international events such as Mercedes Benz Fashion Week held in Istanbul and Arab Fashion Week held in Dubai.

In 2021, he published the book "Sicilia è amore", a volume that collects more than 400 locations that depicts the nature, culture and history of Sicily. There's a description for each place accompanied by photos and a QR Code that refers to the exact geographical position. The proceeds from the book are donated to a charity named "Plastic Free Odv Onlus" in order to fight against pollution caused by plastics.

Notes 

Living people
1995 births
Bocconi University alumni
Italian bloggers
Male bloggers
Artist authors
People from Alcamo
Italian writers
University of Bologna alumni
21st-century Italian writers
21st-century Italian businesspeople